Eric Derwent Walrond (18 December 1898 – 8 August 1966) was an Afro-Caribbean Harlem Renaissance writer and journalist. Born in Georgetown, British Guiana, the son of a Barbadian mother and a Guyanese father, Walrond was well-travelled, moving early in life to live in Barbados, and then Panama, New York City, and eventually England. He made a lasting contribution to literature, his most famous book being Tropic Death, published in New York City in 1926 when he was 28; it remains in print today as a classic of its era.

In it are collected 10 stories, at least one of which had been previously published in small magazines. He had published other short stories prior to this, as well as a number of essays. The scholar Kenneth Ramchand described Walrond's book as a "blistering" work of the imagination; others described his work as "impressionistic" and "frequently telegraphic", reflecting his use of short sentences. The following extract from his short story "Subjection" illustrates his more lyrical narrative style:

A ram-shackle body, dark in the ungentle spots exposing it, jogged, reeled and fell at the tip of a white bludgeon. Forced a dent in the crisp caked earth. An isolated ear lay limp and juicy, like some exhausted leaf or flower, half joined to the tree whence it sprang. Only the sticky milk flooding it was crimson, crimsoning the dust and earth.

Much of the dialogue between Walrond's characters is written in dialect, using the many different tongues loosely centred on the English language to portray the diversity of characters associated with the pan-Caribbean diaspora.

Early life and education
Eric Walrond was born in Georgetown, British Guiana, to a Barbadian mother and a Guyanese father. When Eric was aged eight, his father left, and he moved with his mother, Ruth, to live with relatives in Barbados, where he attended St. Stephen's Boys' School, before moving to Panama at the time when the Panama Canal was being constructed. Here Walrond completed his school education and became fluent in Spanish as well as English. Following training as a secretary and stenographer, he was employed as a clerk in the Health Department of the Canal Commission at Cristóbal, and as a reporter for the Panama Star-Herald newspaper. In 1918 he moved to New York, where he attended Columbia University and was taught by Dorothy Scarborough. He was a member of Alpha Phi Alpha fraternity.

Harlem Renaissance writer 

In New York, Walrond worked at first as hospital secretary, porter, and stenographer. His utopian sketch of a united Africa, "A Senator's Memoirs" (1921), won a prize sponsored by Marcus Garvey. From 1921 to 1923, Walrond was editor and co-owner of an African-American weekly called the Brooklyn and Long Island Informer. He was then hired as associate editor (1923–25) of Negro World, the paper of Garvey's Universal Negro Improvement Association (UNIA). He subsequently became a protégé of the National Urban League's director Charles S. Johnson. Between 1925 and 1927 he was a contributor to, and business manager of, the Urban League's Opportunity magazine, which had been founded in 1923 to help bring to prominence African-American contributors to the arts and politics of the 1920s. He was also a contributor to The Smart Set, The New Republic and Vanity Fair and Negro World. Eric Derwent Walrond published his first short story called, “The Palm Porch” this poem goes into description about a Brothel in the Canal Zone, where a merciless plot to take over the land takes place. His short stories included "On Being Black" (1922), "On Being a Domestic" (1923), "Miss Kenny's Marriage" (1923), "The Stone Rebounds" (1923), "Vignettes of the Dusk" (1924), "The Black City" (1924), and "City Love" (1927) – the year that Duke Ellington began his career in New York and the Harlem Globetrotters were founded. In two consecutive years (1928 and 1929), Walrond was awarded the Guggenheim Fellowship for Fiction.

Later life in England

After a decade in America, Walrond left for England, where he met English writers and artists during the 1930s, including Winifred Holtby. In later life he continued to employ his editorial skills from time to time, while working as an accountant.  He lived from 1939 to 1952 at 9 Ivy Terrace Bradford on Avon, Wiltshire, while working at the Avon Rubber factory in Melksham. However, in 1952 he admitted himself to a psychiatric hospital, Roundway Hospital in Devizes, and stayed there until 1957. After he left the hospital he was involved in a theatrical production at London's Royal Court Theatre in the aftermath of the 1958 Notting Hill race riots. In the Royal Court Theatre, Walrond produces a literary work in "Masks of Arcady".  Robert Bone,  scholar of American literature and a professor of English at Columbia University, gives details of this production in his CLA Journal.

On 8 August 1966, at the age of 67, he collapsed on a street in central London and was pronounced dead on arrival at St. Bartholomew's Hospital. Following an autopsy, he was buried at Abney Park Cemetery, Stoke Newington, on 17 September. His grave lies on a path edge in the southern section.

After his death, which occurred while he was living in reduced circumstances, his early literary work has enjoyed wider recognition, as reflected in Winds Can Wake up the Dead... and The Penguin Book of Caribbean Short Stories, both published in the 1990s, In Search of Asylum, which appeared in 2011, and in James Davis' 2015 biography.  At the time, however, his passing appears to have gone relatively unnoticed, although Arna Bontemps wrote of his death, from a fifth heart attack, in a letter to Langston Hughes, dated 1 September 1966.   Countee Cullen's well-known poem "Incident" is dedicated to Walrond.

Selected bibliography
Novels
 Tropic Death, New York: Boni & Liveright, 1926.
Anthology 
 Parascandola, Louis J. (ed.), Winds Can Wake Up the Dead: an Eric Walrond Reader, Wayne State University Press, 1998.
 Parascandola, Louis J., and Carl A. Wade (eds), In Search of Asylum: the Later Writings of Eric Walrond, University Press of Florida, 2011

References

Further reading
 Berry, Jay A., "Eric Walrond", in Trudier Harris and Thadious M. Davis (eds), Dictionary of Literary Biography: Afro-American Writers from the Harlem Renaissance to 1940, Vol. 51, Cengage Gale, 1986, pp. 296–300.
 Brittan, Jennifer. "The Terminal: Eric Walrond, the City of Colón, and the Caribbean of the Panama Canal." American Literary History 25.2 (2013): 294–316.
 Davis, James. Eric Walrond: A Life in the Harlem Renaissance and the Transatlantic Caribbean (2015), 
 Gable, Craig. Ebony Rising: Short Fiction of the Greater Harlem Renaissance.
 Lewis, David Levering, When Harlem Was in Vogue, Penguin Books, 1997.
 Markham, E. A. (1996). The Penguin Book of Caribbean Short Stories.
 Parascandola, Louis J., and Carl A. Wade (eds), Eric Walrond – The Critical Heritage. University of the West Indies Press, 2012. .
Farrison, W. Edward. CLA Journal, vol. 20, no. 1, 1976, pp. 135–140. JSTOR, www.jstor.org/stable/44329234.

1898 births
1966 deaths
20th-century American novelists
American male novelists
Barbadian novelists
Barbadian male writers
Guyanese novelists
Guyanese emigrants to the United States
American people of Barbadian descent
Guyanese emigrants to England
Harlem Renaissance
People from Georgetown, Guyana
African-American short story writers
American short story writers
Guyanese short story writers
20th-century short story writers
20th-century American male writers
Novelists from New York (state)
20th-century Guyanese writers
American male non-fiction writers
Guyanese people of Barbadian descent
African-American novelists
20th-century African-American writers
African-American male writers